Aspropotamos is a former municipality in the northwestern part of Evrytania, Greece. Since the 2011 local government reform it is part of the municipality Agrafa, of which it is a municipal unit. The municipal unit has an area of 125.954 km2. Population 1,581 (2011). The seat of the municipality was in Raptopoulo.  Aetolia-Acarnania is to the west and the Karditsa regional unit to the north.  Aspropotamos is located west-southwest of Karditsa, northwest of Karpenisi and north-northeast of Agrinio.

Subdivisions
The municipal unit Aspropotamos is subdivided into the following communities (constituent villages in brackets):
Kedra
Lepiana
Neo Argyri
Prasia
Raptopoulo

Other
Aspropotamos has a few schools, a lyceum (middle school), a gymnasium (secondary school) a few churches, banks, a post office.

References

Populated places in Evrytania